Public service agreements (PSAs) detailed the aims and objectives of UK government departments for a three-year period. PSAs were abolished in June 2010 by the Coalition Government.

Such agreements also "describe[d] how targets will be achieved and how performances against these targets will be measured". The agreements consisted of a departmental aim, a set of objectives and targets, and details of who is responsible for delivery.

Previous PSA's
The 30 previous PSAs are:

 Raise the productivity of the UK economy
 Improve the skills of the population, on the way to ensuring a better skills base by 2020 
 Ensure controlled, fair migration that protects the public and contributes to economic growth
 Promote science and innovation in the UK
 Deliver reliable and efficient transport networks that support economic growth
 Deliver the conditions for business success in the UK 
 Improve the economic performance of all English regions and reduce the gap in economic growth rates between regions 
 Maximise employment opportunity for all
 Halve the number of children in poverty by 2010–11, on the way to eradicating child poverty by 2020
 Raise the educational achievement of all children and young people 
 Narrow the gap in educational achievement between children from low income and disadvantaged backgrounds and their peers
 Improve the health and wellbeing of children and young people
 Improve children and young people's safety 
 Increase the number of children and young people on the path to success
 Address the disadvantage that individuals experience because of their gender, race, disability, age, sexual orientation, religion or belief
 Increase the proportion of socially excluded adults in settled accommodation and employment, education or training
 Tackle poverty and promote greater independence and wellbeing in later life
 Promote better health and wellbeing for all 
 Ensure better care for all
 Increase long term housing supply and affordability
 Build more cohesive, empowered and active communities 
 Deliver a successful Olympic Games and Paralympic Games with a sustainable legacy and get more children and young people taking part in high quality PE and sport
 Make communities safer
 Deliver a more effective, transparent and responsive Criminal Justice System for victims and the public
 Reduce the harm caused by alcohol and drugs
 Reduce the risk to the UK and its interests overseas from international terrorism
 Lead the global effort to avoid dangerous climate change
 Secure a healthy natural environment for today and the future  
 Reduce poverty in poorer countries through quicker progress towards the Millennium Development Goals 
 Reduce the impact of conflict through enhanced UK and international efforts

References

 Public service agreements - Cabinet Office

Government of the United Kingdom